As of 2020, there were at least four translations of the Tirukkural available in Arabic. The Kural text is the first, and so far the only, Tamil work to be translated directly into Arabic. It is also the first Tamil work to be released in the Arabian soil.

History of translations

The first translation of the Kural text was made by Muhammad Yousuf Kokan, the then professor and head of the Department of Arabic, Persian and Urdu of Jamalia Arabic College, Chennai. He made the prose translation from an English translation of the original work and published it around 1976 and 1980 under the title "Sacred Verses" (الابيات المقدسة), which is almost a literal translation of the word Tirukkural. The word Kural actually means "couplet" and not "verse".

The second Arabic translation, and the first by a native speaker, was completed by Amar Hasan from Syria in 2015. The work is not a literal translation and maintains the original verse form completed in full for all the 1330 couplets of the Kural text.

In 2014, K. M. A. Ahamed Zubair made a partial translations of about 50 couplets, including the chapters on Glory of Rain (couplets 11 to 20), Speaking Pleasantly (couplets 91 to 100), Learning (couplets 391 to 400), Embracing the Kin (couplets 521 to 530), and In Praise of Love (couplets 1121 to 1130), which were published in his book on translating Tamil poetry into Arabic with special reference to Thirukkural, published in 2017.

A. Jahir Hussain, an assistant professor in the Department of Arabic, Persian and Urdu at the University of Madras, made a complete translation, who presented it at the Kuwait International Book Fair on 30 November 2019. In March 2015, the translation was presented at the four-day Arab International Poet's Conference organised by Society for Culture and Art, affiliated to Saudi Ministry of Culture, held at Dammam city in Saudi Arabia after being vetted by the Ministry of Culture. Beginning in 2011 as a Tamil Nadu state government project and completed in 2013, the translation was published by the International Institute of Tamil Studies and officially released on 4 September 2020. Unlike Kokan, Hussain made his translation directly from the Tamil original of the Kural text, drawing on Mu. Varadarajan's commentary.

Translations

See also
 Tirukkural translations
 List of Tirukkural translations by language

References 

Arabic
Translations into Arabic